By percentage, men form 51%, Women 48.76%, and transgenders 0.24% of the total population of Pakistan. The sex ratio of the Pakistan is 105.07, that means there are 105 men for 100 women in Pakistan. According to 2018 estimates by the World Bank, women constitute 48.54% of the Pakistani population.

Demographic disparity

General population gap
According to the provisional results of the 6th Population & Housing Census conducted in 2017, there are 106,449,322 men, 101,314,780 women, and 10,418 transgenders. By percentage, men form 51%, Women 48.76%, and transgenders 0.24% of the total population of Pakistan. The sex ratio of the Pakistan is 105.07, that means there are 105 men for 100 women in Pakistan.

According to 2018 estimates by the World Bank, women constitute 48.54% of the Pakistani population.

Population gap by age group
By 2018 estimates, the sex ratio at birth stands at 1.05 males born for every female. It peaks at 1.08 males/female for the 25–54 years age group and reaches its lowest point at 0.87 males/female for the 65+ years age group.

Population gap by location
There is a gender gap in the demographics of rural versus urban populations as documented by the 2017 census. There are a total of 67,300,171 males vs 64,886,593 females (ratio: 1.03) in rural areas whereas there are 39,149,151 males vs 36,428,187 females (ratio: 1.07) in urban areas. The provinces/territories with the greatest noted disparity include Balochistan (sex ratio: 1.10) and Islamabad (sex ratio: 1.11).

Infanticide, sex-selective abortion & neonatal abandonment
There is a documented practice of female infanticide, sex-selective abortion, and abandonment of newborn female children in Pakistan. According to the Edhi Foundation, 1210 female babies were killed in Pakistan in 2010 while an estimated 200 pregnancies were aborted on the basis of female sex and up to 90% of babies abandoned to the care of the Edhi Foundation were female. Later reports confirmed a continuing rise in the number female infanticides.

According to Bongaarts, Pakistan has the fifth highest Sex Ratio at Last Birth (SLRB) which may indicate a high rate of sex-selective abortions.

Health disparity

Childhood mortality
According to the Filmer & King, a female child in India or Pakistan has a 30-50% higher chance of dying between the first and fifth years of life. This difference may be attributable to poor nutrition, lack of preventive care and delays in seeking medical care.

Healthcare utilization
In line with patterns observed across South Asia, men in Pakistan continue to play a decision-making role in women's access to healthcare including their utilization of healthcare services in the event of an emergency. Cultural barriers also include restrictions on women's mobility unaccompanied by men.

Education disparity

Literacy rate
Only  45.8% of the female population is literate compared to 69.5% of the male population, according to 2015 estimates.

School enrollment
The school life expectancy (number of years of education from primary to tertiary) of female children is 8 years versus 9 years for male children according to 2017 estimates. According to 2018 data from UNESCO, the net enrollment in primary education is 61.61% for female children whereas it is 73.37% for male children.

Economic disparity

Economic participation
According to 2016 data by UN Women, only 26% of women participated in the labor force in Pakistan. Of these, 73% were employed in agriculture, forestry, hunting, and fishing. Professional and managerial participation of women remained low, with women comprising only 7.4% of STEM professionals working in the field. Women employed in the formal sector also worked excessive hours versus men, and women with 10 years of education or more were noted as having high rates of underemployment or unemployment. Childcare labor was intentionally excluded from this study.

Access to physical & financial capital

Additionally, only 2% of women had received a loan from a financial institution, 2% owned land, and 7.4% women had joint ownership of a house.

Wage gap
Pakistan has the highest wage gap in the world, according to the International Labor Organization; women in Pakistan earn 34% less than men on average. The Global Wage Report 2018/2019 also found women in Pakistan constitute 90% of the bottom 1% of wage earners in the country.

Legal disparity

Requirements for testimony
Article 25 of the Constitution of Pakistan prohibits discrimination on the basis of sex. However, under Article 17 of the Qanun-e-Shahdat (1984), women's witness is discounted to half of a man's witness.

Right to divorce
Muslim women in Pakistan have the right to obtain a khula, in which case they may forfeit their dower, but do not have the right to divorce unless it is delegated to them by the husband at the time of signing the marriage contract. There is no such limitation on men's right to divorce.

Political disparity

Voting bans
Women in Pakistan had suffered from voting rights but now these rights are given back to them. However, local bans have existed in parts of the country and prevented women from voting; in addition, technical prerequisites such as CNIC registration for voting have had unintended effects of disenfranchising female voters in areas where male family members do not approve of female relatives obtaining CNICs.

In the 2013 general elections, there were 13 polling stations where no woman had turned out to vote on polling day.

Electoral turnout
In the 2018 election, the gap between male and female voters increased to 12.5 million. According to the Electoral Commission of Pakistan's final rolls for 2018, only 44.1% of registered voters in Pakistan were female. The gender electoral roll imbalance increased from 10.97 percent in the 2013 general elections to 12.49 percent in 2018 elections. This gender gap is the largest in Balochistan province (15.65 percent), followed by Khyber Pakhtunkhwa (KP) (13.65), Sindh (11.02), and Punjab (11.095). Around 65% of National Assembly constituencies had a gender gap of more than 10%- particularly in Punjab and Khyber Pakhtunkhwa.

Representation in government
Only 4% of female candidates contesting in the 2018 General Elections won seats to the National Assembly. Between 2017-2018, women constituted 20% of the Parliament and in the National Assembly introduced an average of 25 agenda items versus the average 6 agenda items introduced by male Parliamentarians. Women lawmakers on average attended more sittings of both the Senate and the National Assembly (64% and 67% respectively) than male colleagues did during the same period (59% and 54% respectively).

Cultural disparity

Media participation
According to the Federal Union of Journalists, less than 5% of journalists in Pakistan are women. Differences in production & dissemination of culture may be considered reflective of social inequality.

Gender Equality Indices
The Gender Development Index value for Pakistan is 0.750 which places it amongst the lowest in the South Asian region. Pakistan's Gender Inequality Index rank is 133 out of 160 countries, as of 2017.

References 

Women's rights in Pakistan